Sodium-dependent neutral amino acid transporter B(0)AT2 is a protein that in humans is encoded by the SLC6A15 gene.

Function 

SLC6A15 shows structural characteristics of an Na+ and Cl−-dependent neurotransmitter transporter, including 12 transmembrane (TM) domains, intracellular N and C termini, and large extracellular loops containing multiple N-glycosylation sites.

Clinical relevance 

Variants of this gene linked with depression are associated with reduced SLC6A15 expression in the human hippocampus, as well as decreased volume of this brain region.

References

Further reading 

 
 
 
 
 
 

Solute carrier family